William Herman "Boy" Morkel  (2 January 1885 – 6 February 1955) was a South African rugby union player and 14th captain of the South Africa national rugby union team.

Biography
Morkel was born in Somerset West, but he played for Diggers Rugby Club in Johannesburg at the start of his career before returning to the Cape in 1908, joining Somerset West Rugby Club. He was the captain of Western Province when the team won the Currie Cup in 1914.

Morkel made his test debut for  during the third test against the British Isles on 3 September 1910 at Newlands in Cape Town. He was then selected for Springboks on the tour to Europe of 1912–13. Alongside Morkel in the team were his cousins Dougie, and the brothers Jacky and Gerhard. After 1914 Morkel relocated to the Transvaal where he farmed in the district of Potchefstroom. While farming and only occasionally playing some rugby, he was recalled to join Theo Pienaar's 1921 touring team to New Zealand. He was then 35 years old and yet, after the injury suffered by Pienaar, he led the Springboks in all three tests against the All Blacks.

During his rugby career, Morkel played 9 Test matches for South Africa, scored two tries and also played 22 tour matches and scored five tries in the tour matches.

Test history

See also
List of South Africa national rugby union players – Springbok no. 128

References

1885 births
1955 deaths
South African rugby union players
South Africa international rugby union players
Western Province (rugby union) players
People from Somerset West
Rugby union forwards
Rugby union players from the Western Cape